Anatoli is a town and a former municipality in the Ioannina regional unit, Epirus, Greece. Since the 2011 local government reform it is part of the municipality Ioannina, of which it is a municipal unit. The municipal unit has an area of 15.845 km2, the community 7.698 km2. The population (in 2011) was 11,555.

References

Populated places in Ioannina (regional unit)